The women's 4 × 100 metre medley relay competition at the 2002 Pan Pacific Swimming Championships took place on August 29 at the Yokohama International Swimming Pool.  Australia won gold with the previous champion being the United States.

Records
Prior to this competition, the existing world and Pan Pacific records were as follows:

Results
All times are in minutes and seconds.

Heats
Heats weren't performed, as only six teams had entered.

Final 
The final was held on August 29.

References

4 × 100 metre medley relay
2002 Pan Pacific Swimming Championships
2002 in women's swimming